The HESA Kowsar (also spelt Kosar) is an Iranian fighter jet based on the American Northrop F-5. The aircraft is equipped with new fourth generation avionics in combination with an advanced fire control system.

Western analysts have described the plane to be inefficient as a weapon, but having potential for training a new generation of Iranian fighter pilots. According to the Iranian state-media, this fighter jet has "advanced avionics" and multipurpose radar, and it was "100-percent indigenously made". It also uses digital data networks, a glass cockpit, heads-up display (HUD), ballistic computers and smart mobile mapping systems.

Development

On November 3, 2018, there was a ceremony that inaugurated the launch of the Kowsar assembly line at the Iran Aircraft Manufacturing Industries Company (HESA) with at least seven being made. President Hassan Rouhani was present as he inspected the Kowsar in the Defense Industry Day event celebration in Isfahan.

HESA Kowsar has 7 hardpoints with a total capacity of 3200 kg (7054 lbs) of armaments and also has a 20 mm cannon. It can carry up to 4 air to air Fatir missiles, a reverse engineering of Sidewinder missiles, or twelve 250 kg (550 lbs) bombs or five 450 kg (1000 lbs) bombs or two 900 kg (2000 lbs) bombs. Kowsar has an Italian Grifo radar (a Chinese model or its domestic production has been used) with a range of 93 km (57 miles) that can engage two targets simultaneously.

The Iranian press acknowledged that the design for the Kowsar is based on the Northrop F-5, but also lauded it for being the first fighter jet manufactured from the ground up by a Muslim nation and referred to it as a fourth generation fighter.

There were reports of a crash by an Iranian-operated F-5 days after the Kowsar's existence was announced.

Export

On November 26, 2018 Brigadier General Abdolkarim Banitarafi, head of Iran Aviation Industries Organization (IAIO), announced that Iran was ready to export the HESA Kowsar jet and had agreements with Russia, China and Indonesia.

Design

The Kowsar, like the Saegheh and the Azarakhsh, was made based on the frame of the American F-5.

Variants
The Kowsar is produced in single and two-seater variants.

Operational history 
On 25 June 2020, the Iranian Ministry of Defence and Armed Forces Logistics announced that three new Kowsar aircraft had been delivered to the Islamic Republic of Iran Air Force, in a ceremony in Esfahan. The images published showed the aircraft painted in non-combat colours.

Reactions

Official 
Israel's defense minister Avigdor Liberman told press that it was a "natural reaction to an economic crisis", adding "[t]he Iranians are feeling very pressured by the continued US sanctions and in reaction they are coming out with these things, but we also shouldn’t dismiss it". Ofir Gendelman, spokesperson of the prime minister's office tweeted "The Iranian regime unveils the Kowsar plane and claims that it is ‘the first 100% locally-manufactured Iranian fighter jet'. It boasts about its offensive capabilities. But I immediately noticed that this is a very old American war plane (it was manufactured in the ‘50s). It is from the F-5 class of jets which has not been in use for decades". 

However, according to Northrop Grumman, "approximately two-thirds of the original production F-5s remain operational in 26 countries, including the United States."

Commentators 
Alex Lockie opined that the aircraft "looks like a big joke", but its untold purpose –serving as a jet trainer and a light attack plane– could "save Iran's air force".

According to Douglas Barrie, military aerospace senior fellow at the IISS, the Iranians have possibly made upgrades and changes to the Kowsar while keeping the basic F-5 jet frame. He also suggests that while Iran can reverse engineer the jet frame, the problem lies in sourcing engines and avionics.

Specifications

See also

References

External links

Kowsar
Iranian fighter aircraft
Twinjets